The International Children's Games (ICG) is an International Olympic Committee-sanctioned event held every year where children from cities around the world and between the ages of 12 and 15 participate in a variety of sports and cultural activities.

History
The Slovenian sports instructor Metod Klemenc founded the International Children's Games in 1968 with the aim of promoting peace and friendship through sports to the world's youth. He organised the first International Children's Games and Cultural Festival in 1968 with the participation of teams from nine European cities.

Since that time, 37,000 children aged 12 to 15 have been in competition at 47 Summer Games and 6 Winter Games. 411 different cities, 86 countries and all 5 continents have participated. The International Children's Games and Cultural Festival has become the world's largest international multi-sport youth games, and is a recognised member of the International Olympic Committee.

The most recent edition of the International Children's Games was held in Coventry, England from 11 to 16 August 2022.

Locations

Summer Games

Winter Games

See also
Youth Olympic Games (ages 14–18)

References

External links
 Official International Children's Games Website
 New Taipeh International Children's Games 2016
 Inssbruch International Children's Winter Games 2016 
 Alkmaar International Children's Games 2015
 Lake Macquarie International Children's Games 2014 
 Ufa International Children's Winter Games 2013
 Windsor-Essex International Children's Games 2013 
 Lanarkshire International Children's Games 2011 (archived)
 Kelowna International Children's Winter Games 2011
  Athens International Children's Games 2009

Children's sport
Multi-sport events
International Olympic Committee
Recurring sporting events established in 1968